Shu Yong (born in Mayang, Hunan) is a male former canoeist. Shu was the gold medalist at slalom c-1 events in two national games and the gold medalist in the 2000 Asian Championships.

References

Living people
People from Huaihua
People from Shanwei
Sportspeople from Hunan
Chinese male canoeists
Year of birth missing (living people)